Saphenista penai is a species of moth of the family Tortricidae. It is found in Ecuador (Pichincha Province), Bolivia and Peru.

References

Moths described in 1968
Saphenista